Ahsham or Ehsham may refer to:
 Ahsham (film)
 Ahsham (Mughal Infantry)
 Ehsham, Fars
 Ahsham-e Ahmad (disambiguation)
 Ahsham-e Ali Ahmad Kheyari
 Ahsham-e Bakhshui
 Ahsham-e Hajj Khurshid
 Ahsham-e Hasan
 Ahsham-e Jamal
 Ahsham-e Khodadad
 Ahsham Khosrow Khan
 Ahsham-e Kohneh
 Ahsham-e Manu Ahmadi
 Ahsham-e Mohammad Heydar
 Ahsham-e Ommid Ali
 Ahsham Qaedha
 Ahsham-e Sartal
 Ahsham-e Seyyed
 Ahsham-e Zaer Hoseyn-e Ghazanfari
 Ahsham-e Zar-e Mohammad